Cuto may refer to:

People
 Procopio Cutò (1651–1727), Italian chef

Places
 Cuto, Angola

Other
 Cuto (comic)